Nicetown–Tioga is a neighborhood in the North Philadelphia section of the city of Philadelphia, in the U.S. state of Pennsylvania. It comprises two smaller, older neighborhoods, Nicetown and Tioga, although the distinction between the two is rarely emphasized today. The name "Nicetown" is often simply used to refer to any part of Nicetown–Tioga.

Geography

The boundaries of Philadelphia neighborhoods are often not universally agreed upon. There are no "official" boundaries to the Nicetown–Tioga area, but some possible boundaries are:

 Wingohocking Street to the northeast (beyond which lies Logan);
 Clarissa/Windrim to the northwest (beyond which lies Germantown);
 Allegheny Avenue and the SEPTA rail tracks to the south (beyond which lie Allegheny West and Glenwood); and
 Old York Road to the east (beyond which lies Hunting Park).

The Philadelphia City Planning Commission (PCPC) defines Nicetown as a much smaller area bounded by Wingohocking Street, Broad Street, Hunting Park Avenue, and Clarissa Street; it defines Tioga as a smaller area bounded by Broad Street, Hunting Park Avenue, the railroads [exact western boundary unclear], and Allegheny Avenue.

The 19140 ZIP Code includes both Nicetown–Tioga and Hunting Park.

History and economy

1700 to 1850

Nicetown began centuries ago as a small town in what was then rural Philadelphia County, outside the City of Philadelphia (which occupied the area known today as Center City). Mease notes that Nicetown was named for Hans te Neues, a Mennonite immigrant who purchased the land of present-day Nicetown in 1699. Family legend among the Nice/Nyce family states that Hans threw a bottle of schnaps over his first house to christen it. This original early 18th century structure burned in 1800. Hans and his brother Jan had emigrated from Amsterdam in 1698; Jan settled in Germantown. Both were Mennonite ministers and could read and write. Hans and his descendants were well known as zimmermen (builders of houses). One descendant was a member of the Carpenter's Society of Philadelphia in the early 1800s. Another was Captain John Nice of Germantown, who led the charge at the Battle of Germantown during the Revolutionary War. Other authors provide varied suggestions for the origin of Nicetown. Finkel says that it was "[n]amed for de Neus, Dutch Huguenots who settled there about 1700". Other spellings seen for the same surname are Neiss, Neisse, and, of course, the Nice seen in the placename Nicetown. There are 19th-century headstones in nearby Germantown marked with the surname Nice. (Regarding the orthographical "correctness" of surnames and placenames, in past centuries, orthography was often second to pronunciation: for example, the names of the nearby Tookany/Tacony Creek.)

Tioga is a placename used in various places. According to several sources, Tioga is a Mohawk and Iroquois word referring to a place where a stream or river current forks or runs swiftly. The name has been used in North Philadelphia since at least the mid-19th century. Perhaps it was inherited from the Lenape Indians of the area (if in fact they used a word tioga that was either a cognate to, or a borrowing of, the Iroquois word), or perhaps it began as the name of the country estate of a Euro-American gentleman farmer inspired by the Tioga placenames of Tioga County, Pennsylvania and Tioga County, New York.

Throughout the period between 1700 and 1850, the general Nicetown–Tioga area of Philadelphia county was rural, dotted with villages such as Nicetown. It contained farms that were a mixture of humble family farms as well as the country estates of gentleman farmers. Travelers on the Germantown road between Philadelphia (which was then only the area known today as Center City) and Germantown passed through the area. There were woods and swampy places.

1850 to 1950

Like most of North Philadelphia, the Nicetown area experienced periods of explosive industrial growth during this era. The growth spurts waxed and waned with wars and recessions, respectively, as did its ethnic diversity: Irish-Catholics from the famine in Ireland, the Polish-Jewish refugees from eastern Europe after World War II, the influx in the 1960s of African Americans escaping poverty and legal discrimination of the south, and a surge of Puerto Rican relocation. All of these influxes were people of the blue collar and working class, which the neighborhood has always been home to, no matter which culture was largest at any particular time.

Companies with plants in or directly adjacent to Nicetown–Tioga included:
 Midvale Steel
 Brown Instrument Company
 Tastykake
 Budd Company

1950 to present
The industrial culture of the area peaked during World War II, and declined immediately following the war. White flight began in the 1950s and hastened in the 1960s through the 1980s. Today there are a number of abandoned structures and a high crime rate in the neighborhood (hence today's North Philadelphia gallows-humor witticism that "there's nothing nice about Nicetown").

The huge population turnover of the 1960s overwhelmed the ability of the city to provide essential services to its constituents, including shortages of schooling facilities and housing. Deindustrialization in Nicetown led to joblessness and poverty. These factors degraded both public and personal life in Nicetown. Festive traditional events – like the annual Easter parade on Germantown Avenue, summer concerts at the Hunting Park bandstand and the opening of its wooden carousel, patriotic day parades from the American Legion, and the May Day celebration at Steele School – fell from popularity. The lively door-to-door street trade in the neighborhood vanished with the changeover from coal furnaces to gas; electric iceboxes no longer needing the iceman; milk, butter and eggs in abundance at supermarkets leading to the loss of the milkman. The continued change and impoverishment contributed to the flight of tradesmen and blue collar workers who sought work elsewhere. The assassination of Martin Luther King Jr., in April 1968, set off riots that created fear throughout the neighborhood. Racial and economic changes took place and largely impoverished what was known as Nicetown, which suffered from urban decay in the face of suburban growth. Philadelphia, like other Rust Belt cities, slowly started its transition from an industrial city to a postindustrial city.

Nicetown–Tioga saw a brief spurt of urban gentrification in the early to mid-2000s. At the peak of the housing bubble in 2008, the 19140 ZIP Code, which contains roughly Hunting Park and Nicetown–Tioga, had a median home sale price of $42,000. When the bubble burst, those prices declined significantly. In 2010, the average house there sold for $21,250, a 49% decrease in value.

Demographics 
As of 2021, Nicetown–Tioga was 75.5% African American, 24.5% white. Though it is a predominantly black neighborhood, there is an increasingly significant number of Hispanics, particularly in the southeastern section near Hunting Park.

Education

Public libraries
Free Library of Philadelphia operates the Nicetown–Tioga Branch at 3720 North Broad Street. The Free Library of Philadelphia also runs a Hot Spot location in Nicetown, operating out of Mercy Neighborhood Ministries, the purpose of which is to increase computer access to residents.

Colleges 
La Salle University's south campus expands into the northern section of Nicetown–Tioga section, also known as the historic Belfield neighborhood.

Natural Gas Power Plant (SEPTA)
In November 2016, SEPTA board members approved a $26.8 million Natural Gas Power Plant near Wayne Junction Station. It is an 8.8 megawatt plant and would allow regional rail to function in the event of a blackout. Noresco LLC will design the two piston-engine generators that will be located between the Roberts Avenue Rail Yard and the Midvale Bus Depot.

See also 

 Max's Steaks

Citations

General bibliography 
 

 
1700 establishments in Pennsylvania
Neighborhoods in Philadelphia
Populated places established in 1700